Ciprian Petre Porumb (born 6 March 1971) is a Romanian retired professional tennis player and current captain of the Romania Davis Cup Team. On 4 May 1992 he reached his highest ATP singles ranking of 394 whilst his highest doubles ranking was 275 achieved on 20 September 1993.

ATP career finals

Doubles: 1 (0–1)

References

External links
 
 
 

1971 births
Living people
Sportspeople from Cluj-Napoca
Romanian male tennis players
20th-century Romanian people